Lehmann is a lunar impact crater attached to the northern rim of the much larger walled plain Schickard. To the northwest is the crater Lacroix.

Lehmann is heavily worn with an irregular rim. A small double-crater overlays a portion of the northwest rim. The interior floor is nearly flat with groupings of tiny craterlets near the south and west edges. There is a gap in the southern rim which connects the floor to Schickard. A sinuous rille runs along the length of this valley.

References

 
 
 
 
 
 
 
 
 
 
 
 

Impact craters on the Moon